Growth rate may refer to:

By rate
Asymptotic analysis, a branch of mathematics concerned with the analysis of growth rates
Linear growth
Exponential growth, a growth rate classification
Any of a variety of growth rates classified by such things as the Landau notation

By type of growing medium
Economic growth, the increase in value of the goods and services produced by an economy
Compound annual growth rate or CAGR, a measure of financial growth
Population growth rate, change in population over time
Growth rate (group theory), a property of a group in group theory

In biology
The rate of growth in any biological system, see Growth § Biology.